Implements of Mass Destruction / Nuclear Apocalypse:666 is a Split EP by thrash metal bands Hellacaust  and Toxic Holocaust released in 2002.

Track listing

Personnel
Toxic Holocaust
 Joel Grind  — vocals, guitar, bass, drums

Hellacaust
Necromancer - bass, vocals
Hell Bastard - guitars
Myles Deck - drums
Crucifuck - guitars

References

2002 EPs
Toxic Holocaust albums